Lisyansky Peninsula (Russian: Poluostrov Lisyanskogo) is a mountainous peninsula in Khabarovsk Krai, Russian Federation. Cape Duga forms its southern terminus. To its west lies Yeyriney Gulf and to its east Ushki Bay.

References

Peninsulas of Russia
Landforms of Khabarovsk Krai